Golladay may refer to:

People with the family name
Edward Isaac Golladay (1830–1897), American politician from Tennessee.
Jacob Golladay (1819–1887), American politician from Kentucky. 
Jeffrey Golladay (born 1979), American ballet dancer.
Kenny Golladay (born 1993), American football wide receiver for the New York Giants of the National Football League.

Location
Golladay Hall, a historic mansion in Grenada, Mississippi, USA.